Atherigona falcata, the barnyard millet shoot fly, is a species of fly in the family Muscidae. It is found throughout Asia. It is known to affect Echinochloa colona, Echinochloa frumentacea, Echinochloa stagnina, and Panicum sumatrense.

References

Muscidae
Insect pests of millets